Mujahideen (Arabic: مجاهدين mujāhidīn) is the plural of mujahid, one engaged in jihad.

Mujahideen, or variant spellings, may also refer to:

Afghan mujahideen
Afghanistan Mujahedin Freedom Fighters Front
Army of Mujahideen, Syria
Bosnian mujahideen
Chechen mujahideen
East Indonesia Mujahideen
Harkat-ul-Mujahideen, Pakistan
Hizbul Mujahideen, Pakistan
Indian Mujahideen
Islamic Unity of Afghanistan Mujahideen
Kurdish Mujahideen
Ministry of Mujahideen, Algeria
Mujahideen Army (Iraq)
Mujahedeen KOMPAK, Indonesia
People's Mujahedin of Iran
Sinai Mujahideen

See also

Mujahid (disambiguation)
Mujahideen Shura Council (disambiguation)
Al-Shabaab (militant group), or Harakat al-Shabaab al-Mujahideen